7-F-5-MeO-MET (5-MeO-7-F-MET, 5-Methoxy-7-fluoro-N-methyl-N-ethyltryptamine) is a tryptamine derivative which acts as a serotonin receptor agonist selective for the 5-HT2 subtypes, with a pEC50 of 8.71 at 5-HT2A, vs 8.25 at 5-HT2B and 7.69 at 5-HT2C. In animal tests it produced the most potent head-twitch response of a range of related fluorinated tryptamine derivatives tested, though still with slightly lower potency than psilocybin.

See also 
 7-Chloro-AMT
 5-Fluoro-MET
 4-Fluoro-5-methoxy-DMT
 5-MeO-MET
 Methylethyltryptamine
 5-Methoxy-7,N,N-trimethyltryptamine
 O-4310

References 

Designer drugs
Psychedelic tryptamines
Serotonin receptor agonists
Tryptamines
Fluoroarenes
Methoxy compounds